Roger Joseph Lafrenière (July 24, 1942 — June 22, 2009) was a Canadian ice hockey defenceman who played 13 games in the National Hockey League (NHL) with the Detroit Red Wings and St. Louis Blues between 1963 and 1972. The rest of his career, which lasted from 1962 to 1976, was mainly spent in the minor leagues.

Career statistics

Regular season and playoffs

References

External links
 

1942 births
2009 deaths
Buffalo Bisons (AHL) players
Canadian ice hockey defencemen
Cincinnati Wings players
Denver Spurs (WHL) players
Detroit Red Wings players
EHC Basel players
Hamilton Red Wings (OHA) players
Ice hockey people from Montreal
Memphis Wings players
Omaha Knights (CHL) players
Pittsburgh Hornets players
Providence Reds players
Roanoke Valley Rebels (SHL) players
St. Louis Blues players
San Diego Gulls (WHL) players